Seven Stages to Achieve Eternal Bliss is a 2018 American black comedy film directed by Vivieno Caldinelli and written by Christopher Hewitson, Justin Jones and Clayton Hewitson. The film stars Kate Micucci, Sam Huntington, Dan Harmon, Mark McKinney, Rhea Seehorn, Dana Gould, Maria Bamford, Brian Posehn, Lilan Bowden, Jon Dore, Josh Brener, Mindy Sterling, J. Lee, Brian Girard, Michael St. Michaels and Taika Waititi. The film was released on March 6, 2020, by MarVista Entertainment.

Cast 
Kate Micucci as Claire   
Sam Huntington as Paul    
Dan Harmon as Cartwright
Mark McKinney as Cultist
Rhea Seehorn as Nordheim
Dana Gould as Pearl
Maria Bamford as Cultist
Brian Posehn as Cultist
Lilan Bowden as Anthea
Jon Dore as Tony
Josh Brener as Cultist
Mindy Sterling as Beatrice
J. Lee as Stone
Brian Girard as Wallace
Michael St. Michaels as Cultist
Taika Waititi as Storsh
Matt Jones as Phil
Ryan Simpkins as Cultist
Britney Young as Cultist
Craig Cackowski as Golfer
Ron Lynch as Cultist
John Yuan as Cultist
Matt Yuan as Cultist
Lola Kelly as Cultist
Adam Brodie as Cultist
Robert Evans as Armund Nordheim 
John J. Lozada as The Mascot

Release
The film premiered at the Tribeca Film Festival on April 20, 2018. The film was released on March 6, 2020, by MarVista Entertainment.

References

External links
 

2018 films
American comedy films
2018 comedy films
2010s English-language films
2010s American films